NFP–Labour Coalition was the coalition of the National Federation Party and Fiji Labour Party under the leadership of Timoci Bavadra, formed in 1987 to contest that year's general election. The coalition won the election with 28 seats in the House of Representatives to the Alliance Party's 24 seats, ending the Alliance Party's 21-year rule in Fiji. The government lasted only a month when it was deposed by the military coup of 1987.

 
Political parties established in 1987
Political parties disestablished in 1987